Dries Mertens (born 6 May 1987), nicknamed "Ciro", is a Belgian professional footballer who plays as a striker or winger for Süper Lig club Galatasaray and the Belgium national team.

As a youth, Mertens played for Stade Leuven, Anderlecht and Gent, and made his debut on loan to Eendracht Aalst in the Belgian Third Division. In 2006, he moved to Dutch Eerste Divisie club AGOVV Apeldoorn, where he spent three years before a €600,000 move to Utrecht of the Eredivisie. Two years later he and teammate Kevin Strootman were transferred to PSV Eindhoven for a combined fee of €13 million, and won the KNVB Cup and Johan Cruyff Shield in 2012. In 2013, Mertens signed for Napoli for a €9.6 million fee and has since made over 300 appearances for the club. He won the Coppa Italia and Supercoppa Italiana in 2014, and was named in the Serie A Team of the Year during the 2016–17 season. In 2020, he scored his 122nd goal for the club, surpassing Marek Hamšík as Napoli's all-time top goalscorer.

Mertens made his Belgium debut in 2011 and has since made over 100 appearances for the national team. He was part of the nation's squads at the FIFA World Cup in 2014, 2018 and 2022 and the UEFA European Championship in 2016 and 2020, helping them to a third-place finish at the 2018 tournament. In 2016, he was named Belgian Footballer of the Year.

Club career

Early career
Born in Leuven, Mertens started his career as a boy at the now-dissolved local club Stade Leuven. It was here that the scouts of Anderlecht first spotted Mertens, ultimately resulting in him being offered a chance to join the club's youth academy in 1998. He spent five years in the youth setup at Anderlecht before being released in 2003, with coaches finding him to be too short and physically incapable of competing at a professional level. Following his release from Anderlecht, Mertens was signed by fellow Belgian Pro League side, Gent. Following two seasons in Gent's youth academy, Mertens was loaned to Eendracht Aalst for the 2005–06 season. He excelled with the third division side and was named Player of the Year. The coaching staff at Gent, much like those at Anderlecht before, remained unconvinced of Mertens given his slight frame, however, and loaned him out again the following season, this time to AGOVV Apeldoorn in the Netherlands.

AGOVV
On 1 July 2006, Mertens officially signed for AGOVV Apeldoorn, who later dissolved in 2013, on a season-long loan with the option of purchase. He managed a return of 2 goals in 35 appearances during a season which saw him become a fan favourite amongst De Blauwen supporters. Mertens' form prompted AGOVV, led by new manager John van den Brom, to exercise the option to sign the Belgian permanently the following season. It was a move that paid off for the Dutch club as Mertens ended the season having 15 goals in 38 appearances for the club.

Such was his influence that Mertens was named new club captain for the 2008–09 Eerste Divisie season. Mertens excelled in his new role and contributed a further 13 goals for the season which contributed to him being awarded the Golden Bull award for the most talented player in the Eerste Divisie. It would be his last season with the club, however, as at the end of the season he agreed to join Eredivisie side Utrecht. Mertens made 110 appearances across all competitions for AGOVV during his three seasons at the club and netted 31 goals.

Utrecht
Having agreed a deal with AGOVV in March 2009, Utrecht officially completed the signing of Mertens at the start of the 2009–10 Eredivisie season for a €600,000 transfer fee. In his debut season with the club, Mertens netted six league goals en route to being named runner-up to Ajax's Luis Suárez for the Dutch Footballer of the Year award. He was also awarded the Di Tommaso Trophy for Utrecht's Player of the Season. He improved on his tally the following season, netting 10 goals in 31 league appearances for Utrecht, including a final day hat-trick against AZ, and a further three goals in his first experience in the UEFA Europa League. In total, Mertens scored 14 goals across all competitions and contributed 24 assists. It proved to be his last season at the club, though, as his form at the Stadion Galgenwaard caught the attention of some of the league's biggest clubs. Mertens' two-season spell in Utrecht yielded 21 goals in 86 appearances across all competitions.

PSV Eindhoven
In June 2011, it was announced that Mertens had signed for fellow Eredivisie club PSV Eindhoven as a replacement for the departing Balázs Dzsudzsák in a dual transfer with Utrecht teammate Kevin Strootman for a combined fee of €13 million. He scored on his competitive debut for the club on 7 August 2011, netting PSV's only goal in a 3–1 loss to AZ. Later that month, on 28 August, Mertens scored his first hat-trick for PSV in a 6–1 drubbing of Excelsior. Mertens' strong start to season culminated with him netting four goals in a 7–1 rout of Roda JC on 24 September 2011, meaning he had scored 11 goals in his first 7 appearances for PSV. Towards the back end of the campaign, Mertens lost a number of teeth during a collision with Heracles goalkeeper Remko Pasveer, although he managed to score during the incident. It was revealed on social media platform Twitter that Pasveer had found one of Mertens' teeth lodged in his head three weeks after the players had collided. Mertens ultimately ended the season having scored 21 goals in 33 matches, the fourth highest in the Eredivisie. He also scored three goals in four KNVB Cup matches, including a header in the final at De Kuip, Rotterdam, leading PSV to a 3–0 win over Heracles.

Mertens added to his silverware at the start of the following season as PSV beat Ajax 4–2 to lift the Johan Cruyff Shield. On 30 September 2012, Mertens and Jürgen Locadia, who was making his Eredivisie debut, both scored hat-tricks as PSV defeated VVV-Venlo 6–0. Mertens ultimately scored 14 league goals, and 16 across all competitions as PSV ended the season as runners-up to Ajax in the Eredivisie. He also aided his side's cause with a further 17 assists. It would be his final season in the Eredivisie, however, as at the conclusion of the campaign PSV accepted an offer from Serie A side Napoli for his signature. Mertens departed Eindhoven having made 88 appearances and scored 45 goals over the course of two seasons.

Napoli
Mertens' agent Søren Lerby confirmed on 16 June 2013 that the player had agreed to sign with Napoli. He became Rafael Benítez's first signing as new Napoli manager after a reported fee of €9.5 million was agreed with PSV. He made his Serie A debut on 25 August 2013, coming on as a second-half substitute for Marek Hamšík in a 3–0 win over Bologna. His first goal for Napoli came on 30 October when he netted the winner in a 2–1 away victory over Fiorentina. In Napoli's first game following the Serie A winter break on 6 January 2014, Mertens scored his first brace for the club in a 2–0 win over Sampdoria. He then scored Napoli's second goal in their 2–0 win over Juventus on 30 March, helping inflict only the second league defeat over the eventual champions. In the final of the Coppa Italia on 3 May 2014, Mertens replaced Marek Hamšík in the 64th minute and went on to score in stoppage time, securing a 3–1 win over Fiorentina.

Mertens claimed another winners' medal on 22 December 2014 after Napoli's penalty shoot-out victory over Juventus in the Supercoppa. Despite being predominantly used as a substitute, he continued his fine form for Napoli over the course of the next season and a half, netting 10 goals and contributing 11 assists across all competitions in 2014–15, and 11 more goals in 2015–16. His tally in the latter campaign included a brace in Napoli's joint-largest ever winning margin in the Europa League, a 5–0 win over Belgian side Club Brugge. Mertens also scored a second-half hat-trick in a convincing 6–0 victory over Bologna on 19 April 2016.

Following the sale of Gonzalo Higuaín – the previous season's Capocannoniere – to rivals Juventus, and a serious injury to his replacement Arkadiusz Milik, Mertens assumed a more senior role in the centre of Napoli's attack for the 2016–17 Serie A season. On 11 December 2016, he netted a hat-trick in a 5–0 Serie A victory over Cagliari before taking it a step further in the next match by scoring four goals in a 5–3 win over Torino. Mertens' four goals, which included the fourth fastest hat-trick in Serie A history, was the first haul scored by a Napoli player since Beppe Savoldi in 1977. It also saw him become the first player to score successive league hat-tricks since Juventus' Pietro Anastasi in 1974, and the first to score seven goals across two matches since Antonio Angelillo in 1958. His form for club and country was rewarded when, on 30 December, he was named Belgian Footballer of the Year for 2016, beating Chelsea's Eden Hazard and Radja Nainggolan of Roma to the award.

On 4 February 2017, Mertens and Hamšík both scored hat-tricks in a 7–1 win over Bologna, a result which saw Napoli score seven away goals in a match for the first time in the club's history. On the final day of the season he scored his 50th league goal for Napoli, and 28th for the campaign, ultimately ending one goal behind Golden Boot winner Edin Džeko. He maintained his goal scoring form the following season during which he scored 22 goals for the campaign.

On 28 November 2018, Mertens scored his 100th goal for Napoli when he netted twice in a 3–1 UEFA Champions League win over Red Star Belgrade. He then made his 200th Serie A appearance for the club on 14 April 2019 in a 3–1 win over Chievo, marking the occasion with an assist for Kalidou Koulibaly's opening goal. On 28 April, Mertens scored in a 2–0 away win over Frosinone, which allowed him to equal Diego Maradona's tally of 81 goals in Serie A for Napoli. The following season, in October 2019, he surpassed Maradona's tally of 115 goals for the club across all competitions when he netted twice in a 3–2 Champions League win over Red Bull Salzburg, becoming the club's second-highest scorer of all time, behind Hamšík. On 25 February 2020, Mertens scored the opening goal in an eventual 1–1 home draw against Barcelona in the first leg of the round of 16 of the UEFA Champions League; with this goal, he tied Hamšík as Napoli's all-time highest goalscorer, with 121 goals. He was later substituted early in the second half due to injury. On 13 June, he scored the equalizing goal in a 1–1 home draw against Inter Milan in the second leg of 2019–20 Coppa Italia semi-final, which saw him overtake Hamšík to become Napoli's outright all-time leading goalscorer with 122 goals; the result also allowed Napoli to advanced to the Coppa Italia Final. On 17 June, he signed a two–year contract extension with the club. Later that day, he started in the Coppa Italia final against Juventus, and was later substituted for Milik in the second half; Napoli won 4–2 on penalties following a 0–0 draw after regulation time.

On 21 March 2021, Mertens scored his 99th and 100th Serie A goals for Napoli in a 2–0 win against Roma.

On 21 November 2021 Mertens scored his 103rd Serie A goal for Napoli in a 3–2 defeat to Inter, becoming the club's top scorer of all time in Serie A.

Galatasaray
On 8 August 2022, Mertens joined Turkish club Galatasaray on a free transfer.
As of early March 2023, he scored 6 goals and made 3 assists in 22 official games he played for his new club.

International career

Youth career and early senior career

Having previously represented Belgium at youth level, Mertens received his first senior call-up by national team coach Georges Leekens on 1 October 2010 for the nation's UEFA Euro 2012 qualifying matches against Kazakhstan and Austria. Though he never featured in either match, Mertens would make his debut on 9 February the following year in a friendly match against Finland in Ghent. He scored his first goal for Belgium on 15 August 2012 in the 125th Derby der Lage Landen. Mertens, having come on as substitute for Nacer Chadli, scored once and assisted twice, to help Belgium overcome a 2–1 deficit versus the Netherlands and win 4–2.

2014 FIFA World Cup
Mertens was named in Marc Wilmots' 23-man squad for Belgium's 2014 FIFA World Cup campaign in Brazil on 13 May 2014. In the nation's final warm-up match for the tournament on 7 June, Mertens scored a late winner to secure a 1–0 victory over Tunisia. He made his first appearance in Belgium's opening match of the World Cup, replacing Chadli at half time and scoring a late winner in a 2–1 victory over Algeria in Belo Horizonte. Prior to the World Cup, Mertens had made a bet with his father that he would score at the tournament. After the match, he posted a photo on Instagram of him shaving his father's mustache off as reward for winning the bet. He made five appearances in total at the World Cup as Belgium were eliminated in the quarter-finals at the hands of eventual runners-up, Argentina.

UEFA Euro 2016
Following the World Cup, Belgium embarked on their qualification campaign for Euro 2016. Mertens netted his first brace for Belgium in their opening qualifying match, netting twice in three minutes in a 6–0 win over Andorra. The following year, he scored one and assisted another in a 3–1 win over Israel which ensured that Belgium secured top spot in their qualifying group. He was later named in Belgium's squad for the tournament proper and featured in all five of the nation's matches as Belgium fell at the quarter-final stage once again, this time losing out to Wales.

2018 FIFA World Cup
Under new manager Roberto Martínez, Mertens scored five goals in Belgium's qualification for the 2018 FIFA World Cup, including two in an 8–1 home win over Estonia on 13 November 2016. He was then selected in Belgium's tournament squad and scored in the nation's opening match in a 3–0 win over Panama. He featured interchangeably as a starter and substitute for the remainder of the tournament as Belgium ended third, defeating England in the third place play-off.

UEFA Euro 2020
On 17 June 2021, Mertens played his 100th match for Belgium in a 2–1 win over Denmark during the UEFA Euro 2020.

2022 FIFA World Cup 
Mertens was part of the Belgian squad for the 2022 World Cup in Qatar, where the team performed badly, failing to make it out of the group stages. On March 17 2023, new Belgian coach Domenico Tedesco dropped Mertens from the squad for European Championship qualifying games, citing the player's lack of match fitness.

Style of play
A versatile and hard-working forward, Mertens is a fast, creative, diminutive, and agile player, with a low centre of gravity, who possesses good technique and dribbling skills, which enables him to get past opponents when in possession of the ball. Possessing good vision, passing, shooting ability, movement off the ball, and an eye for goal, he is known for his ability both to score and create goals, and is capable of getting onto the end of passes or creating space for himself or his teammates by making attacking runs into the box. His favoured role is as a winger on the left flank, a position which allows him to cut into the centre and strike on goal from outside the area with his stronger right foot, although he is also capable of playing on the right, and has even been used as an attacking midfielder by manager Dick Advocaat. He is also an accurate free kick taker. During the 2016–17 season, following the departure of Gonzalo Higuaín to rivals Juventus and an injury to the club's main striker Arkadiusz Milik, Napoli coach Maurizio Sarri frequently deployed Dries Mertens either as a main striker, or in a false nine role, seemingly positioned as a lone centre-forward, rather than as a left winger, where he had previously faced competition from Lorenzo Insigne for a starting position; Sarri's tactical change was met with great results, and Mertens's goalscoring output increased dramatically as a result of this switch.

Career statistics

Club

International

Honours
PSV
 KNVB Cup: 2011–12
 Johan Cruyff Shield: 2012

Napoli
 Coppa Italia: 2013–14, 2019–20
 Supercoppa Italiana: 2014

Belgium
FIFA World Cup third place: 2018

Individual
 Belgian Third Division Player of the Season: 2006
Eerste Divisie Golden Bull: 2009
 Di Tommaso Trophy: 2010
Belgian Footballer of the Year: 2016
Ballon d'Or nomination: 2017
 Serie A Team of the Year: 2016–17

See also
 List of men's footballers with 100 or more international caps

References

External links

 Dries Mertens at S.S.C. Napoli
 
 
 
 

1987 births
Living people
Belgian footballers
Belgium youth international footballers
Belgium international footballers
Association football forwards
Eredivisie players
Eerste Divisie players
Serie A players
Süper Lig players
S.C. Eendracht Aalst players
AGOVV Apeldoorn players
R.S.C. Anderlecht players
K.A.A. Gent players
FC Utrecht players
PSV Eindhoven players
S.S.C. Napoli players
Galatasaray S.K. footballers
Expatriate footballers in Italy
Expatriate footballers in the Netherlands
Expatriate footballers in Turkey
Belgian expatriate footballers
Belgian expatriate sportspeople in the Netherlands
Belgian expatriate sportspeople in Italy
Footballers from Flemish Brabant
Flemish sportspeople
2014 FIFA World Cup players
UEFA Euro 2016 players
2018 FIFA World Cup players
UEFA Euro 2020 players
2022 FIFA World Cup players
FIFA Century Club
Belgian expatriate sportspeople in Turkey
Sportspeople from Leuven